Pseudanarta is a genus of moths of the family Noctuidae.

Species
 Pseudanarta actura Smith, 1908
 Pseudanarta basivirida (Barnes & McDunnough, 1911)
 Pseudanarta caeca Dod, 1913
 Pseudanarta crocea (H. Edwards, 1875)
 Pseudanarta daemonalis Franclemont, 1941
 Pseudanarta damnata Franclemont, 1941
 Pseudanarta exasperata Franclemont, 1941
 Pseudanarta flava (Grote, 1874)
 Pseudanarta flavidens (Grote, 1879)
 Pseudanarta heterochroa Dyar, 112
 Pseudanarta perplexa Franclemont, 1941
 Pseudanarta pulverulenta (Smith, 1891)
 Pseudanarta singula (Grote, 1880)
 Pseudanarta vexata Franclemont, 1941

References
Natural History Museum Lepidoptera genus database
Pseudanarta at funet

Cuculliinae